Frans Johannes Cornelius Cronje is a South African former cricketer who played for Border, Griqualand West and Orange Free State during the 1980s and 1990s. He later became a film producer, director and writer, specialising in films with a Christian theme. He produced the 2008 film Hansie, based on the life of his brother, Hansie Cronje, the former South Africa national cricket team captain.

Early life
Cronje was born in 1967 in Bloemfontein to Ewie and San-Marie ( Susanna Maria Strydom) Cronje. The Cronje family descended from Huguenot immigrants from Normandy in the late 1600s. His father had represented Orange Free State from 1961 to 1971 and later served as president of the Orange Free State Cricket Union. His younger brother, Hansie became an international cricketer, captaining South Africa between 1993 and 2000.

In 1985, Cronje represented South Africa at schoolboys level in both rugby union and cricket.

Cricket career
Cronje played in domestic cricket in South Africa between 1986 and 1996.

His first-class debut came in November 1986 against the touring Australian team as part of the 1986–87 rebel tour of South Africa.

Filmography

References

External links

1967 births
Border cricketers
Griqualand West cricketers
Free State cricketers
South African film directors
Living people
South African cricketers